Movin 'On is the first single by Japanese band Dream as a trio, released on January 1, 2000. The single reached number 15 on the weekly Oricon charts, charting for seven weeks, and sold 100,910 copies. This song was used as an opening theme to the TV Tokyo show Sukiyaki!! London Boots Daisakusen. The promotional video for the A-side was released on the Daydream video. First pressings came with one of four trading cards (one of each member, and one of all three).

Track list
 Movin' On (original mix) mixed by Dave Ford
 Movin' On (Dub's Not Illegal mix) remixed by Izumi "D・M・X" Miyazaki
 Movin' On (Keep on mix) remixed by Naoki Atsumi
 Movin' On (D-Z Crystal Oxygen mix) remixed by D-Z
 Movin' On (instrumental)

Credits
 Lyrics: Yuko Ebine
 Music: Hideaki Kuwabara
 Arrangement: Keisuke Kikuchi
 Chorus arrangement: Yasu Kitajima

External links
 http://www.oricon.co.jp/music/release/d/45127/1/

2000 singles
Dream (Japanese group) songs
2000 songs
Avex Trax singles